The Radeon R100 is the first generation of Radeon graphics chips from ATI Technologies. The line features 3D acceleration based upon Direct3D 7.0 and OpenGL 1.3, and all but the entry-level versions offloading host geometry calculations to a hardware transform and lighting (T&L) engine, a major improvement in features and performance compared to the preceding Rage design. The processors also include 2D GUI acceleration, video acceleration, and multiple display outputs. "R100" refers to the development codename of the initially released GPU of the generation. It is the basis for a variety of other succeeding products.

Development

Architecture
The first-generation Radeon GPU was launched in 2000, and was initially code-named Rage 6 (later R100), as the successor to ATI's aging Rage 128 Pro which was unable to compete with the GeForce 256. The card also had been described as Radeon 256 in the months leading up to its launch, possibly to draw comparisons with the competing Nvidia card, although the moniker was dropped with the launch of the final product.

The R100 was built on a 180 nm semiconductor manufacturing process. Like the GeForce, the Radeon R100 featured a hardware transform and lighting (T&L) engine to perform geometry calculations, freeing up the host computer's CPU. In 3D rendering the processor can write 2 pixels to the framebuffer and sample 3 texture maps per pixel per clock. This is commonly referred to as a 2×3 configuration, or a dual-pipeline design with 3 TMUs per pipe. As for Radeon's competitors, the GeForce 256 is 4×1, GeForce2 GTS is 4×2 and 3dfx Voodoo 5 5500 is a 2×1+2×1 SLI design. Unfortunately, the third texture unit did not get much use in games during the card's lifetime because software was not frequently performing more than dual texturing.

In terms of rendering, its "Pixel Tapestry" architecture allowed for Environment Mapped Bump Mapping (EMBM) and Dot Product (Dot3) Bump Mapping support, offering the most complete Bump Mapping support at the time along with the older Emboss method. Radeon also introduced a new memory bandwidth optimization and overdraw reduction technology called HyperZ. It basically improves the overall efficiency of the 3D rendering processes. Consisting of 3 different functions, it allows the Radeon to perform very competitively compared to competing designs with higher fillrates and bandwidth on paper.

ATI produced a real-time demo for their new card, to showcase its new features. The Radeon's Ark demo presents a science-fiction environment with heavy use of features such as multiple texture layers for image effects and detail. Among the effects are environment-mapped bump mapping, detail textures, glass reflections, mirrors, realistic water simulation, light maps, texture compression, planar reflective surfaces, and portal-based visibility.

In terms of performance, Radeon scores lower than the GeForce2 in most benchmarks, even with HyperZ activated. The performance difference was especially noticeable in 16-bit color, where both the GeForce2 GTS and Voodoo 5 5500 were far ahead. However, the Radeon could close the gap and occasionally outperform its fastest competitor, the GeForce2 GTS, in 32-bit color.

Aside from the new 3D hardware, Radeon also introduced per-pixel video-deinterlacing to ATI's HDTV-capable MPEG-2 engine.

R100's pixel shaders
R100-based GPUs have forward-looking programmable shading capability in their pipelines; however, the chips are not flexible enough to support the Microsoft Direct3D specification for Pixel Shader 1.1. A forum post by an ATI engineer in 2001 clarified this:

Implementations

R100
The first versions of the Radeon (R100) were the Radeon DDR, available in Spring 2000 with 32 MB or 64 MB configurations; the 64 MB card had a slightly faster clock speed and added VIVO (video-in video-out) capability. The core speed was 183Mhz and the 5.5 Ns DDR SDRAM memory clock speed was 183 MHz DDR (366 MHz effective).
The R100 introduced HyperZ, an early culling technology (maybe inspired by the Tile Rendering present in St Microelectronics PowerVR chips) that became the way to go in graphic evolution and generation by generation rendering optimization, and can be considerend the first non tile rendering-based (and so DX7 compatible) card to use a Z-Buffer optimization.
These cards were produced until mid-2001, when they were essentially replaced by the Radeon 7500 (RV200).

A slower and short-lived Radeon SDR (with 32 MB SDRAM memory) was added in mid-2000 to compete with the GeForce2 MX.

Also in 2000, an OEM-only Radeon LE 32MB DDR arrived. Compared to the regular Radeon DDR from ATI, the LE is produced by Athlon Micro from Radeon GPUs that did not meet spec and originally intended for the Asian OEM market. The card runs at a lower 143 MHz clock rate for both RAM and GPU, and its Hyper Z functionality has been disabled. Despite these handicaps, the Radeon LE was competitive with other contemporaries such as the GeForce 2 MX and Radeon SDR. Unlike its rivals, however, the LE has considerable performance potential, as is possible to enable HyperZ through a system registry alteration, plus there is considerable overclocking room. Later drivers do not differentiate the Radeon LE from other Radeon R100 cards and the HyperZ hardware is enabled by default, though there may be visual anomalies on cards with HyperZ hardware that is defective.

In 2001, a short-lived Radeon R100 with 64 MB SDR was released as the Radeon 7200. After this and all older R100 Radeon cards were discontinued, the R100 series was subsequently known as the Radeon 7200, in keeping with ATI's new naming scheme.

RV100
A budget variant of the R100 hardware was created and called the Radeon VE, later known as the Radeon 7000 in 2001 when ATI re-branded its products.

RV100 has only one pixel-pipeline, no hardware T&L, a 64-bit memory bus, and no HyperZ. But it did add HydraVision dual-monitor support and integrated a second RAMDAC into the core (for Hydravision).

From the 3D performance standpoint, the Radeon VE did not fare well against the GeForce2 MX of the same era, though its multi-display support was clearly superior to the GeForce2 MX, however. The Matrox G450 has the best dual-display support out of the GPUs but the slowest 3D performance.

RV100 was the basis for the Mobility Radeon notebook solution.

RV200
The Radeon 7500 (RV200) is basically a die-shrink of the R100 in a new 150 nm manufacturing process. The increased density and various tweaks to the architecture allowed the GPU to function at higher clock speeds. It also allowed the card to operate with asynchronous clock operation, whereas the original R100 was always clocked synchronously with the RAM. It was ATI's first Direct3D 7-compliant GPU to include dual-monitor support (Hydravision).

The Radeon 7500 launched in the second half of 2001 alongside the Radeon 8500 (R200). It used an accelerated graphics port (AGP) 4x interface. Around the time that the Radeon 8500 and 7500 were announced, rival Nvidia released its GeForce 3 Ti500 and Ti200, the 8500 and Ti500 are direct competitors but the 7500 and Ti200 are not.

The desktop Radeon 7500 board frequently came clocked at 290 MHz core and 230 MHz RAM. It competed with the GeForce2 Ti and later on, the GeForce4 MX440.

Radeon Feature Matrix

Models

Competing chipsets
 NVIDIA GeForce 256 and GeForce2
 PowerVR Series 3
 3dfx Voodoo 5
 S3 Savage 2000

See also
 Comparison of ATI Chipsets
 List of AMD graphics processing units

References

 "ATI Radeon 256 Preview" by Anand Lal Shimpi, AnandTech.com, April 25, 2000, retrieved January 17, 2006
 "ATI Radeon 32MB SDR" by Anand Lal Shimpi, AnandTech.com, October 13, 2000, retrieved January 17, 2006
 "ATI Radeon 64MB DDR" by Matthew Witheiler, AnandTech.com, July 17, 2000, retrieved January 17, 2006
 "Beyond3D 3D Tables" Beyond3D.com, retrieved January 17, 2006
 Vlachos, Alex. Radeon's Ark demo, 2000.

External links
 techPowerUp! GPU Database

ATI Technologies products
Computer-related introductions in 2000
Graphics cards